Gergeri is the seat of Rouvas municipal unit in Heraklion regional unit in the Greek island of Crete. The population was 1,440 in 2011. Gergeri's location is at a region called "Pano Riza" of Psiloreiti's, and in that region there are also the villages Panasos, Nivritos, Zaros, Vorizia and Kamares. Nowadays, everyone in Gergeri and in Pano Riza is proud for the surplus of companies in Gergeri, and for the football club Rouvas F.C., which now is playing on Football League 2. Near Gergeri also is the Rouva's Forest, which is very famous and very beautiful.
During the Greek War of Independence the Commissioner of Crete, Emmanouil Tombazis, gathered 3,000 Cretans in Gergeri to face a force of 12,000 Turkish-Egyptian soldiers at Ayia Varvara. On August 20, 1823 and despite a valiant defence against the much larger and better organised force, the Cretans had to retreat after losing 300 men in the battle at the village of Amouryelles.

References

Populated places in Heraklion (regional unit)